"I Got Mexico" is a song co-written and recorded by American country music artist Eddy Raven.  It was released in January 1984 as the first single from the album I Could Use Another You.  Co-written with Frank J. Myers, the song was Raven's first No. 1 hit on the Billboard Hot Country Singles chart in June 1984, and spent a total of thirteen weeks in the top 40 of the country chart.

The song became the first No. 1 produced or co-produced by Paul Worley, who had primarily been known as a session guitarist and a songwriter. Worley had previously produced hit singles for Gary Morris and The Nitty Gritty Dirt Band, but he would become better known later as the producer of Martina McBride, and bands such as the Dixie Chicks, The Band Perry and Lady Antebellum.

Charts

Weekly charts

Year-end charts

References

Eddy Raven songs
1984 singles
Songs written by Frank J. Myers
Song recordings produced by Paul Worley
Songs written by Eddy Raven
RCA Records singles
1984 songs
Songs about Mexico